Louis Antoine de Poirot (1735–1813) was a Jesuit painter and translator of the 18th and early 19th century, who worked in the service of the Qianlong Emperor of China. He adopted the Chinese name He Qingtai (賀清泰). He was the last of the Western painters who worked for the Qianlong Emperor, together with Father Giuseppe Panzi. The two painters replaced the more famous father Giuseppe Castiglione and Jean-Denis Attiret.

Poirot also made a translation of the Old Testament in the Manchu language, and a translation of the New Testament into the Chinese language. He was also in charge of the translations between Latin and Manchu for the diplomatic correspondence between Beijing and Saint Petersburg (Russia).

See also
Jesuit China missions

References

 Stephen K. Batalden, Kathleen Cann, John Dean, Sowing the word: the cultural impact of the British and Foreign Bible Society, 1804-2004 Sheffield Phoenix Press, 2004  
 Lorry Swerts, Mon Van Genechten, Koen De Ridder, Mon Van Genechten (1903–1974): Flemish Missionary and Chinese Painter : Inculturation of Chinese Christian Art, Leuven University Press, 2002  

18th-century French Jesuits
1735 births
1813 deaths
19th-century French Jesuits